The qualification procedure for the 2014 African Women's Championship, the continent's women's association football championship started on 14 February 2014. A record 25 teams applied for the 2014 African Women's Championship. Four teams eventually withdrew before playing any match.

This tournament also served as the first stage of qualification for the 2015 FIFA Women's World Cup for the African zone.

Qualification ties were played on a home-and-away two-legged basis. If the sides were level on aggregate after the second leg, the away goals rule was applied, and if still level, the tie proceeded directly to a penalty shoot-out (no extra time was played).

First round
The best placed teams from the 2012 tournament Cameroon, Equatorial Guinea and South Africa received a bye to the second round.

The first round was held on 14–16 February (first leg) and 28 February–2 March 2014 (second leg).

|}
1 South Sudan and Mozambique withdrew. Ethiopia and Comoros advance to the next round.
2 Sierra Leone withdrew from the match because of financial problems. Nigeria advanced to the next round.
3 Guinea Bissau withdrew. Senegal advanced to the next round.

Algeria won 2–0 on aggregate.

Tunisia won 5–2 on aggregate.

Ethiopia won by default.

Ghana won 6–0 on aggregate.

Ivory Coast won 5–0 on aggregate.

2–2 on aggregate. Rwanda won by away goals.

Nigeria won by default.

Senegal won by default.

Comoros won by default.

Zimbabwe won 3–1 on aggregate.

Zambia won 3–2 on aggregate.

Second round
The second round was held on 23–25 May (first leg) and 6–8 June 2014 (second leg).

|}
4 Comoros withdrew before the second leg, thus South Africa advanced to the final tournament.

Algeria won 5–3 on aggregate.

Ghana won 5–0 on aggregate.

3–3 on aggregate. Ivory Coast won on away goals.

Nigeria won 12–1 on aggregate.

Cameroon won 2–1 on aggregate.

South Africa won by default.

Zambia won 2–0 on aggregate.

Qualified teams

 (hosts)

Goalscorers
4 goals

 Faiza Ibrahim
 Azizat Oshoala
 Desire Oparanozie
 Portia Modise
 Leandra Smeda

3 goals

 Naïma Bouhenni
 Ella Kaabachi
 Hellen Mubanga

2 goals

 Fatima Sekouane
 Agnes Aduako
 Elizabeth Cudjoe
 Ines Nrehy
 Esther Sunday
 Sanah Mollo
 Zina Hidouri

1 goal

 Fethia Bekhedda
 Nachida Laifa
 Dame Ngenda
 Francine Zouga
 Njoya Nkout
 Sara Abdallah
 Salma Tarek
 Dorine Chuigoué
 Genoveva Añonma
 Jade Boho
 Hillia Kobblah
 Samira Suleman
 Josée Nahi
 Ida Guehai
 Jeanne Gnago
 Ange N'Guessan
 Mariam Diakité
 Rebecca Elloh
 Jackie Ogolla
 Mural Amau
 Blessing Edoho
 Cecilia Nku
 Alice Niyoyita
 Jeanne Nyirahatashima
 Clementine Mukamana
 Sakhla Sylla
 Mamello Makhabane
 Nomathemba Ntsibande
 Shiwe Nogwanya
 Asha Rashid
 Donasia Daniel
 Dhekra Gomri
 Leïla Maknoun
 Meriem Houij
 Susan Banda
 Misozi Zulu
 Violet Bepete
 Rutendo Makore
 Marjoury Nyaumwe

References

External links
AWC 2014 Qualifiers (2014), CAFonline.com

qualification
Women's Championship qualification
2015 FIFA Women's World Cup qualification
2014 in women's association football
2014